Lisle High School is a public four-year high school located in Lisle, Illinois, a western suburb of Chicago, Illinois, in the United States. It is part of Lisle Community Unit School District 202.

History
Lisle Community High School first opened in 1957, at the location of the current junior high.  It remained there until 1974, after the elementary and high school districts merged to form Lisle Community Unit School District 202.  A new building was erected for the incoming class of 1975.  In 2001, the high school received a makeover.  The most notable changes were:  the addition of a new auditorium, eight new classrooms, new band and choir rooms, and a second gym with a balcony.  The class of 2007 was the 50th class to graduate from Lisle Senior High School, and the class of 2016 graduated with a class of about 135 students.

Academics
In 2017, Lisle had an average composite ACT score of 25 and graduated 96% of its senior class. Lisle has made Adequate Yearly Progress on the Prairie State Achievements Examination, a state test part of the No Child Left Behind Act.

The staff consists of 41 teachers; the average class size is 20.91 students.

Athletics
Lisle has 24 total athletic teams: 10 boys, 3 all-inclusive, and 11 girls teams, which play in the Illinois Central Eight Conference and Illinois High School Association. Lisle's mascot is the Lions.
Current sports:
Football
Volleyball
Cross Country
Tennis
Soccer
Golf
Cheerleading 
Lionettes Dance team
Basketball
Bowling
Wrestling
Baseball
Softball
Track
Scholastic Bowl

State Championships
Lisle Senior High won its first IHSA state championship in 1985, when the women's volleyball team won the title. Within the last few years, Lisle Senior High has had a progressive set of athletic teams. The boys' soccer team won super sectionals 2 years in a row, winning the 1A state championship in 2010, and finishing in 2nd in 2011. The girls' soccer team placed 4th in state in the 2010, 2012, and 2019 seasons. The scholastic bowl team at Lisle has won 2 state championships in a row (in 2010 and 2011), earning the school's first state title in 25 years. In 2013, the boys' baseball team won the class 2A State Title. Lisle's dance team also placed 11th in the 2A division at the 2016 state dance competition. Lisle is well known for its competitive wrestling team, which has sent many wrestlers to the state competition.

Activities
Band
Choir
Art Club
Key Club
C.T.A.O - Colored Teachers As One. This is a local chapter of the NAACP, and is a club where BIPOC+ teachers can receive support, and discuss Critical Race Theory and its implications on Lisle's school system.
AFS - Autism for Students. A club where students with Autism and/or Aspergers can find support.
Theater
Student Government
Science Olympiad
Ecology Club
National Honors Society
Gay Straight Alliance - Students can experiment with their sexuality here.
Spanish Club
French Club
Math Team
Scholastic Bowl - This club is a bowling club, and has recently won a state-wide bowling competition.
DECA

Notable alumni
 John Grochowski, author and radio personality 
 Lester Lewis, television writer for The Larry Sanders Show
 Jennifer Malenke, film and stage actress
Thomas Aeschi, Swiss politician and businessman

References

External links
Official website
"Report Cards: Lisle students make big strides." Daily Herald (Arlington Heights, Illinois). Updated November 1, 2011.

Public high schools in Illinois
Educational institutions established in 1956
Lisle, Illinois
Schools in DuPage County, Illinois
1956 establishments in Illinois